Eilífr Goðrúnarson was a late 10th-century skald, considered to be the author of the poem Þórsdrápa. He is also credited with Hákonar drápa jarls and a fragment remains of a poem with Christian allusions which is also believed to be his work. He was a court poet of Hákon the Powerful.

External links
Jörmungrund: Þórsdrápa (Old Norse text with English translation and thorough structural and linguistic analysis.)
Eilífr's entry in the Skaldic Poetry of the Scandinavian Middle Ages database

10th-century Icelandic poets